Rosalie Silberman Abella  (born July 1, 1946) is a Canadian jurist. In 2004, Abella was appointed to the Supreme Court of Canada, becoming the first Jewish woman and refugee to sit on the Canadian Supreme Court bench. She retired from the federal bench in 2021.

Early life and education 
Rosalie Silberman Abella was born on July 1, 1946, the daughter of Jacob and Fanny (Krongold) Silberman. She was born in a displaced persons camp in Stuttgart, Germany. Her father was born in Sienno, Poland, in 1910, while her mother was born in Ostrowiec in 1917. Abella's older sister was murdered in the Holocaust. Her parents both survived, Jacob Silberman was liberated from Theresienstadt Concentration Camp, Fanny Silberman survived Buchenwald Concentration Camp. Jacob had studied law at the Jagiellonian University in Cracow and was appointed head of legal services for displaced persons in the US Zone of Southwest Germany. In 1950, her family was admitted into Canada, though Jacob Silberman was not allowed to practise law because he was not a citizen. 

From a young age, Abella was determined to become a lawyer. She attended Oakwood Collegiate Institute and Bathurst Heights Secondary School in Toronto, Ontario. She then attended the University of Toronto, where she earned a B.A. in 1967 and an LL.B. in 1970. In 1964, Abella graduated from the Royal Conservatory of Music in classical piano.

Career 
Abella was called to the Ontario bar in 1972. She practised civil and criminal litigation until 1976, when, at the age of 29, she was appointed to the Ontario Family Court (which is now part of the Ontario Court of Justice) by then–attorney general Roy McMurtry, becoming both the youngest and first pregnant judge in Canadian history. She was appointed to the Ontario Court of Appeal in 1992.

In 1983–1984, Abella served as the sole commissioner of the federal Royal Commission on Equality in Employment (known as the Abella commission), appointed by Lloyd Axworthy. As commissioner, she coined the term and concept of "employment equity", a strategy for reducing barriers in employment faced by women, visible minorities, people with disabilities, and Aboriginal peoples. The theories of equality and discrimination developed in the report were adopted in Andrews v Law Society of British Columbia (1989), the Supreme Court of Canada's first decision regarding equality rights under the Canadian Charter of Rights and Freedoms. Its recommendations report was also adopted by jurisdictions including New Zealand, South Africa, and Northern Ireland.

In 1988, Abella moderated the televised English-language leaders' debate between Brian Mulroney (PC), John Turner (Liberal) and Ed Broadbent (NDP).

Abella has acted as chair of the Ontario Labour Relations Board, the Ontario Study into Access to Legal Services by the Disabled and the Ontario Law Reform Commission, and as a member of the Ontario Human Rights Commission and of the judicial inquiry into the Donald Marshall, Jr. case. From 1988 to 1992, she taught at McGill University Faculty of Law as the Boulton Visiting Professor.

In 2004, Prime Minister Paul Martin appointed Abella to the Supreme Court of Canada. Abella became the first Jewish woman to sit on the court. She was eligible to serve on the Supreme Court until July 1, 2021, when she turned 75. In February 2021, she announced that she would retire on that date, and Prime Minister Justin Trudeau started the selection process of a new justice who would succeed her. Mahmud Jamal was selected as her replacement, and assumed office on July 1, 2021. Following her retirement from the Supreme Court, Abella has served as a visiting professor at Fordham University School of Law and Harvard Law School.

Abella is an authority on constitutional law and human rights law. Her opinions often cite foreign and international law. According to Sian Elias, they are regarded as authoritative by judges in many common law countries.

Honours and personal life 
Abella has received at least 38 honorary degrees. She became a fellow of the Royal Society of Canada in 1997. She was awarded the Canadian version of the Queen Elizabeth II Golden Jubilee Medal in 2002. She was elected a foreign honorary member of the American Academy of Arts and Sciences in 2007. In 2012 she was awarded the Canadian version of the Queen Elizabeth II Diamond Jubilee Medal. In May 2016, she was awarded an honorary degree from Yale University, becoming the first Canadian woman to earn such an honour. In addition, she has been a judge of the Giller Prize. In January 2017, Northwestern Pritzker School of Law's Center for International Human Rights named her the Global Jurist of the Year for 2016 in recognition of her commitment to human rights and international criminal justice. In April 2018, Abella was elected a member of the American Philosophical Society.

Abella is the widow of historian Irving Abella, and has two sons.

Director Barry Avrich is currently in post-production on a feature documentary on Abella's life.

See also 
 Reasons of the Supreme Court of Canada by Justice Abella

References

External links 
 Biography at the Supreme Court of Canada

1946 births
21st-century Canadian judges
21st-century women judges
Canadian Jews
Canadian people of Polish-Jewish descent
Canadian women judges
Commanders Crosses of the Order of Merit of the Federal Republic of Germany
Constitutional court women judges
Fellows of the American Academy of Arts and Sciences
Fellows of the Royal Society of Canada
Justices of the Court of Appeal for Ontario
Justices of the Supreme Court of Canada
Living people
Members of the American Philosophical Society
The Royal Conservatory of Music alumni
University of Toronto alumni
University of Toronto Faculty of Law alumni